Dolores Zdravkova Nakova (Bulgarian: Долорес Накова; born 15 June 1957 in Ruse) is a Bulgarian former rower who competed in the 1980 Summer Olympics.

References

External links
 

1957 births
Living people
Bulgarian female rowers
Olympic rowers of Bulgaria
Rowers at the 1980 Summer Olympics
Olympic bronze medalists for Bulgaria
Olympic medalists in rowing
Medalists at the 1980 Summer Olympics
World Rowing Championships medalists for Bulgaria
Sportspeople from Ruse, Bulgaria